Edward Cool Robertson (November 1876 – October 31, 1903) was an American football player and coach. He served as the head football coach at Earlham College in Richmond, Indiana for one season, in 1901, after a successful playing career at Purdue University.

Robertson died in a tragic train accident in 1903 when he was serving as an assistant coach at Purdue. He and 15 others associated with the Purdue team perished during a train collision in Indianapolis while the team was on its way to play Indiana.

Head coaching record

References

External links
 

1876 births
1903 deaths
19th-century players of American football
American football halfbacks
American football quarterbacks
Earlham Quakers football coaches
Purdue Boilermakers football coaches
Purdue Boilermakers football players
People from Albion, Indiana
Coaches of American football from Indiana
Players of American football from Indiana